Lucky Devils is a 1933 American Pre-Code action film about group of Hollywood stuntmen and their dangerous daredevil stunt work, starring William Boyd and Bruce Cabot, and features an early appearance by Lon Chaney Jr.

Plot

Cast
 William Boyd as Skipper Clark (as Bill Boyd)
 Bruce Cabot as Happy White
 William Gargan as Bob Hughes
 William Bakewell as Slugger Jones
 Lon Chaney Jr. as Frankie (as Creighton Chaney)
 Bob Rose as Rusty (as Robert Rose)
 Dorothy Wilson as  Fran Whitley
 Julie Haydon as Doris Jones
 Sylvia Picker as Midge
 Gladden James as Neville Silverman
 Edwin Stanley as Mr. Spence
 Roscoe Ates as Gabby (as Rosco Ates)
 Phyllis Fraser as Toots
 Betty Furness as Ginger
 Alan Roscoe as Mr. Hacket
 Rochelle Hudson as Movie Star

Production
The film is based on an original story written by real-life stuntman Bob Rose and is noteworthy for being produced by David O. Selznick and Merian C. Cooper, who would work together on 1933's groundbreaking King Kong.

Reception
The film ended up making a profit of $65,000.

References

External links

1933 drama films
1933 films
American drama films
American black-and-white films
Films about stunt performers
Films about filmmaking
Films directed by Ralph Ince
1930s American films